Indanidine is an alpha-adrenergic agonist.

References

Alpha-1 adrenergic receptor agonists
Imidazolines
Indazoles